Electra, also spelt Elektra, is one of the most popular mythological characters in tragedies. She is the main character in two Greek tragedies, Electra by Sophocles and Electra by Euripides. She is also the central figure in plays by Aeschylus, Alfieri, Voltaire, Hofmannsthal, and Eugene O'Neill. She is a vengeful soul in The Libation Bearers, the second play of Aeschylus' Oresteia trilogy. She plans out an attack with her brother to kill their mother, Clytemnestra.

In psychology, the Electra complex is named after her.

Family
Electra's parents were King Agamemnon and Queen Clytemnestra. Her sisters were Iphigeneia and Chrysothemis, and her brother was Orestes.  In the Iliad, Homer is understood to be referring to Electra in mentioning "Laodice" as a daughter of Agamemnon.

Murder of Agamemnon

Electra was absent from Mycenae when her father, King Agamemnon, returned from the Trojan War. When he came back, he brought with him his war prize, the Trojan princess Cassandra, who had already borne him twin sons. Upon their arrival, Agamemnon and Cassandra were murdered, by either Clytemnestra herself, her lover Aegisthus, or both. Clytemnestra had held a grudge against her husband for sacrificing their eldest daughter, Iphigenia, to the goddess Artemis in exchange for a fair wind so that he could set sail for Troy. In some versions of this story, Iphigenia was saved by the goddess at the last moment.

Eight years later, Electra returned home from Athens at the same time as her brother, Orestes. (Odyssey, iii. 306; X. 542). According to Pindar (Pythia, xi. 25), Orestes was saved either by his old nurse or by Electra, and was taken to Phanote on Mount Parnassus, where King Strophius took charge of him. When Orestes was twenty, the Oracle of Delphi ordered him to return home and avenge his father's death.

Murder of Clytemnestra

According to Aeschylus, Orestes recognized Electra's face before the tomb of Agamemnon, where both had gone to perform rites to the dead, and they arranged how Orestes should accomplish his revenge. Orestes and his friend Pylades, son of King Strophius of Phocis and Anaxibia, killed Clytemnestra and Aegisthus (in some accounts with Electra helping).

Before her death, Clytemnestra cursed Orestes. The Erinyes or Furies, whose duty it is to punish any violation of the ties of family piety, fulfill this curse with their torment. They pursue Orestes, urging him to end his life. Electra was not hounded by the Erinyes.

In Iphigeneia in Tauris, Euripides tells the tale somewhat differently. In his version, Orestes was led by the Furies to Tauris on the Black Sea, where his sister Iphigenia was being held. The two met when Orestes and Pylades were brought to Iphigenia to be prepared for sacrifice to Artemis. Iphigeneia, Orestes, and Pylades escaped from Tauris. The Furies, appeased by the reunion of the family, abated their persecution. Electra then married Pylades.

Adaptations of the Electra story

Plays
 The Oresteia, a trilogy of plays by Aeschylus
 Electra, play by Sophocles
 Electra, play by Euripides
 Orestes, play by Euripides
 Electra, a lost play by Quintus Tullius Cicero of which nothing is known but the name and that it was "a tragedy in the Greek style"
 Electra (1901) a play by Benito Pérez Galdós
 Elektra, a 1903 play by Hugo von Hofmannsthal, based on the Sophocles play
 Mourning Becomes Electra, 1931 play by Eugene O'Neill, based on Aeschylus
 Electra, 1937 play by Jean Giraudoux
 The Flies, a 1943 play by Jean-Paul Sartre, modernizing the Electra myth by introducing the theme of existentialism
 Electra (started in 1949, first performed 1987), a play by Ezra Pound and Rudd Fleming
 Electra, or The dropping of the masks (1954) a play by Marguerite Yourcenar
 Electra and Orestes, plays by Adrienne Kennedy, 1972
 Electra (1974) a play by Robert Montgomery, directed by Joseph Chaikin
 Electra, 1995 drama by Danilo Kiš
 Electricidad, 2004 play by Luis Alfaro, modern adaptation of Electra based in the Chicano barrio
 Electra/Orestes, 2015 play by Jada Alberts and Anne-Louise Sarks
 Small and Tired, 2017 play by Kit Brookman
 Pitribhumi, 2021 play by Sandarbha
 Electra, 2021 play by Tadashi Suzuki

Opera
 Elektra, by Richard Strauss, with libretto by Hugo von Hofmannsthal, based on his own play
 Electra, by Mikis Theodorakis
 Mourning Becomes Electra, by Marvin David Levy, based on Eugene O'Neill's play
 Idomeneo, by Wolfgang Amadeus Mozart, where she plays the role of rejected lover/villain
 Electra, opera by Johann Christian Friedrich Haeffner, Libretto by Adolf Fredrik Ristell after Nicolas Francois Guillard
 Électre, tragédie lyrique by Jean-Baptiste Lemoyne, set to a libretto by Nicolas-François Guillard

Films
 Electra, a film by Michael Cacoyannis, starring Irene Papas, based on Euripides
 Mourning Becomes Electra (film), a film by Dudley Nichols, starring Rosalind Russell and Michael Redgrave
 The Forgotten Pistolero, a Spaghetti Western by Ferdinando Baldi starring Leonard Mann and Luciana Paluzzi
 Ellie, a film which transfers the story to a Southern U.S. locale
 Szerelmem, Elektra (Elektra, My Love), film by Miklós Jancsó, starring Mari Törőcsik
 Filha da Mãe and Mal Nascida, both by Portuguese film director João Canijo
 elektraZenSuite, medium-length film by Alessandro Brucini, based on texts by Aeschylus, Sophocles, William Shakespeare, Hugo von Hofmannsthal, Sylvia Plath, and the Zen Buddhist monk Takuan Soho
 Electra, film by Shyamaprasad, starring Nayanthara, Skanda Ashok, Manisha Koirala and Prakash Raj, based on Euripides

Literature
 Elektra (Laodice) is the unnamed protagonist and speaker in Yannis Ritsos's long poem Beneath the Shadow of the Mountain. This poem forms part of the cycle colloquially referred to as the New Oresteia.
 Electra is the eponymous narrator of her story in the book 'Electra' by Henry Treece. (Bodley Head, 1963: Sphere Books., 1968).
 Electra on Azalea Path is the title of Sylvia Plath's poem published in 1959, in reference to the Electra Complex
 A central character in Donna Leon's crime fiction series is a present-day young woman named Elettra (the Italian form of "Electra"), who is highly resourceful and who bears some resemblance to the mythological character.
 House of Names, by Colm Tóibín. A retelling of the story of Agamemnon's death and the resulting events. (Simon and Schuster, May 9, 2017. 275 pages)
  Elektra, a novel by Jennifer Saint that tells the parallel story of Elektra's life, along with her mother Clytemnestra, and Cassandra of Troy

See also
130 Elektra - asteroid named after Electra.

Bibliography

References

External links
 

 

Matricides
Children of Agamemnon
Princesses in Greek mythology